Kanellos Kanellopoulos (born 25 April 1957) is a Greek former cyclist. He competed in the individual road race event at the 1984 Summer Olympics.  He was also the pilot and human engine for the 1988 MIT Daedalus project, completing the 72.4 mi (115.11 km) flight from Crete to the Greek island of Santorini in 3 hours, 54 minutes.  It was the longest human-powered flight in history.

Major results
1976
 2nd Road race, National Road Championships
1980
 1st  Road race, National Road Championships
1981
 1st Overall Tour of Hellas
1982
 1st  Road race, National Road Championships
1984
 1st  Road race, National Road Championships
1985
 1st  Road race, National Road Championships
1986
 2nd Overall Tour of Hellas
1987
 1st  Road race, National Road Championships
 2nd Overall Tour of Hellas

References

External links
 

1957 births
Living people
Greek male cyclists
Olympic cyclists of Greece
Cyclists at the 1984 Summer Olympics
Sportspeople from Patras
20th-century Greek people